Loren White may refer to:

 Bob White (fullback) (Loren Robert White), American football player
 Loren H. White (1863–1923), American politician from New York